The Harold Lloyd Birthplace is a historic one-story house in Burchard, Nebraska. It was built in 1893 for Harold Lloyd's parents. Lloyd lived in the house until 1897; he later became a silent actor and comedian, and he died in 1971 in Beverly Hills, California. The house has been listed on the National Register of Historic Places since December 22, 1993.

References

National Register of Historic Places in Pawnee County, Nebraska
Houses completed in 1893
1893 establishments in Nebraska
Birthplaces of individual people